On 21 February 2017, at 8:59 am local time, a Beechcraft B200 King Air aircraft operating a charter flight, carrying a pilot and four passengers bound for King Island, crashed seconds after taking off from Essendon Airport in Melbourne, Australia.

Four American passengers and the Australian pilot died in the crash.

Accident
The pilot made two mayday calls before the aircraft clipped the roof of a building housing the DFO Essendon. The aircraft then impacted the ground a few metres away and ignited, starting a fire. The DFO complex, located on the airport grounds, had not yet begun the day's trading. All five people on board were killed in the crash, including the four passengers who were American tourists on their way to King Island to play golf. Victorian Premier Daniel Andrews said it was the worst civil aviation accident in Victoria in 30 years.

Media sources reported that the aircraft crashed as a result of an engine failure on take-off.

Some local residents and aviation groups have stated that the crash shows buildings have been constructed too close to the airport.

The official investigation's initial findings include that there were no pre-existing aircraft faults, that the pilot made a mayday call, that the voice recorder failed, and that witnesses said the take-off took "longer than normal". Engine tear-downs show that both powerplants were free to rotate and both propellers showed evidence of rotation, although only the left propeller left slash damage to the building roof. Further findings would be made public as the investigation was concluded.

Aircraft
The aircraft was a Beechcraft B200 King Air, serial number BB-1544 and registered as VH-ZCR; it was manufactured in 1996 and had accumulated just under 7000 hours of service time.

Aftermath

The Executive Director of the Australian branch of the Aircraft Owners and Pilots Association (AOPA) criticised the practice of allowing commercial developments, such as the Essendon DFO complex, at Australian airports, saying these reduced the options available to pilots in emergencies. He stated that AOPA had been calling on governments for two decades to stop such developments. A spokesman for the Australian Federation of Air Pilots also criticised commercial development of land at Essendon Airport. Anti-airport campaigners renewed calls for the airport to be closed.

Summary
An investigation by the Australian Transport Safety Bureau determined the accident was a result of one of the flight control trim tabs being set incorrectly. Failure of the pilot to realise the rudder trim was set fully to the left caused a longer than normal takeoff, and caused the aircraft to slip and yaw to the left once airborne. Ultimately the uncorrected configuration caused a loss of control of the aircraft. The checklist used by the pilot did not contain a specific check for the trim tab position before takeoff. The investigation was hindered by the lack of data from the cockpit voice recorder, which had stopped working on a previous flight. Furthermore, the weight of the aircraft at takeoff exceeded its maximum takeoff weight, but this factor was not determined to be a contributing factor to the crash.

In September 2021, it was reported that the pilot failed a proficiency test two years prior to the crash.

Notes

References

Essendon Airport Beechcraft King Air crash
Essendon Airport Beechcraft King Air crash
Essendon Airport Beechcraft King Air crash
Essendon Airport Beechcraft King Air crash
Essendon Airport Beechcraft King Air crash
Essendon Airport Beechcraft King Air crash
2017 disasters in Australia